Road signs in Botswana are based on the SADC-RTSM, a document designed to harmonise traffic signs in member states of the Southern Africa Development Community.

A white background signifies the sign is permanent, while a yellow background signifies that the sign is temporary. Warning signs are an upwards-pointing red triangle and black pictogram describing the danger or obstruction. Speed limit signs are a red circle with the limitation in black. Botswana drives on the left.

Gallery

Priority signs

Mandatory signs

Prohibitory signs

Warning signs

Guidance signs

Information signs

Botswana